Ghargaon is a village in the Karmala taluka of Solapur district in Maharashtra state, India.

Demographics
Covering  and comprising 304 households at the time of the 2011 census of India, Ghargaon had a population of 1312. There were 694 males and 618 females, with 187 people being aged six or younger.

References

Villages in Karmala taluka